|}

The Cecil Frail Stakes is a Listed flat horse race in Great Britain open to mares and fillies aged three years or older.
It is run at Haydock Park over a distance of 6 furlongs (1,206 metres), and it is scheduled to take place each year in May.

The race was first run in 1999.  Until 1996 the name Cecil Frail was given to a rated handicap at the same course.

Winners

See also 
Horse racing in Great Britain
List of British flat horse races

References
Racing Post:

Sprint category horse races for fillies and mares
Haydock Park Racecourse
Flat races in Great Britain
Recurring sporting events established in 1999
1999 establishments in England